We Never Die is a 1993 Hungarian comedy film written by, directed and starring Róbert Koltai. The film was selected as the Hungarian entry for the Best Foreign Language Film at the 66th Academy Awards, but was not accepted as a nominee.

The story is set in the 1960s and is about a traveling coat hanger salesman who educates his teenage nephew about life through their travels.

Cast
 Róbert Koltai as Gyula
 Mihály Szabados as Imi
 Gábor Máté as Imre
 Tamás Jordán as Vigéc
 Kathleen Gati as Nusi
 Andor Lukáts as Pap
 György Hunyadkürthy as Pucus
 Péter Blaskó as Apa
 Flóra Kádár

See also
 List of submissions to the 66th Academy Awards for Best Foreign Language Film
 List of Hungarian submissions for the Academy Award for Best Foreign Language Film

References

External links
 

1993 films
1993 comedy films
Hungarian comedy films
1990s Hungarian-language films